Masua (lit. Torch), also transliterated as Massu'a, is an Israeli settlement organized as a moshav shitufi in the West Bank. Located in the Jordan Valley, with an area of 6,000 dunams, it falls under the jurisdiction of Bik'at HaYarden Regional Council.

The international community considers Israeli settlements in the West Bank illegal under international law, but the Israeli and US governments dispute this.

History
The village was established in 1969 as a Nahal settlement, and was converted to a civilian moshav by a HaOved HaTzioni gar'in five years later.

According to ARIJ, Israel has confiscated 2,209 dunams of land from the Palestinian village of Al-Jiftlik in order to construct Masua.

Sartava Nature Reserve

Four kilometers west-southwest of Masua is the Sartava Nature Reserve, named in tribute to a mountain from which, in Mishnaic times, Jews would relay signals via torch to indicate that a new month had been proclaimed.

The summit of Sartava has remains of a fort built by King Alexander of Judea. The area of Sartava, which is split down its length due to the Great Rift Valley, is unique in that it embodies a transition between the Mediterranean habitats of Samaria on the one hand and the more desert-like habitats of the Arava on the other.

See also
Rosh Hodesh

References

Moshavim
Israeli settlements in the West Bank
Populated places established in 1969
1969 establishments in the Israeli Military Governorate